Julie Anne Smith (born December 3, 1960), known professionally as Julianne Moore, is an American actress. Prolific in film since the early 1990s, she is particularly known for her portrayals of emotionally troubled women in independent films, as well as for her roles in blockbusters. She is the recipient of numerous accolades, including an Academy Award, a BAFTA Award, two Golden Globe Awards, and two Emmy Awards.

A theater graduate of Boston University, Moore began her career with a series of television roles. From 1985 to 1988, she was a regular in the soap opera As the World Turns, earning a Daytime Emmy Award for her performance. Her film debut was in Tales from the Darkside: The Movie (1990), and she continued to play small roles for the next four years, including in the thriller The Hand That Rocks the Cradle (1992). Moore first received critical attention with Short Cuts (1993), Vanya on 42nd Street (1994) and Safe (1995) continued this acclaim. Starring roles in the blockbusters Nine Months (1995) and The Lost World: Jurassic Park (1997) established her as a Hollywood leading lady.

Moore went on the receive the Academy Award for Best Actress for her portrayal of an Alzheimer's patient in Still Alice (2014). Her other Oscar-nominated roles were in Boogie Nights (1997), The End of the Affair (1999), Far from Heaven (2002) and The Hours (2002). Other notable roles include in the films The Big Lebowski (1998), Magnolia (1999), Hannibal (2001), Children of Men (2006), A Single Man (2009), The Kids Are All Right (2010), Crazy, Stupid, Love (2011), Wonderstruck (2017), and Gloria Bell (2019). She won a Primetime Emmy Award for her portrayal of Sarah Palin in the HBO film Game Change (2012). She won the Cannes Film Festival Award for Best Actress for Maps to the Stars (2014). Among her highest-grossing releases are the final two films in the series The Hunger Games and the spy film Kingsman: The Golden Circle (2017).

In addition to her acting work, Moore has written a series of children's books about a character named Freckleface Strawberry. In 2015, Time named her one of the 100 most influential people in the world, and in 2020, The New York Times named her one of the greatest actors of the 21st century. She is married to director Bart Freundlich, with whom she has two children.

Early life and education
Moore was born Julie Anne Smith on December 3, 1960, at the Fort Bragg army installation in North Carolina. Her father, Peter Moore Smith, a paratrooper in the United States Army during the Vietnam War, attained the rank of colonel and became a military judge. Her mother, Anne (née Love 1940–2009), was a Scottish psychologist and social worker from Greenock, Renfrewshire, who had immigrated with her family to the United States in 1951. Moore has a younger sister, Valerie Smith, and a younger brother, the novelist Peter Moore Smith. Having a Scottish mother, Moore claimed British citizenship in 2011 in honor of her.

Because of her father's occupation, Moore frequently moved around the United States as a child. She was close to her family as a result, but has said she never had the feeling of coming from one particular place. The family lived in multiple locations, including Alabama, Georgia, Texas, Panama, Nebraska, Alaska, New York, and Virginia, and Moore attended nine different schools. The constant relocating made her an insecure child, and she struggled to establish friendships. In spite of these difficulties, Moore later remarked that an itinerant lifestyle was beneficial to her future career: "When you move around a lot, you learn that behavior is mutable. I would change, depending on where I was ... It teaches you to watch, to reinvent, that character can change."

When Moore was sixteen, the family moved from Falls Church, Virginia, where Moore had been attending Justice High School, to Frankfurt, West Germany, where she attended Frankfurt American High School. She was clever and studious, a self-proclaimed "good girl", and she planned to become a doctor. She had never considered performing, or even attended the theater, but she was an avid reader and it was this hobby that led her to begin acting at the school. Moore appeared in several plays, including Tartuffe and Medea, and with the encouragement of her English teacher, she chose to pursue a theatrical career. Her parents supported her decision, but asked that she train at university to provide the added security of a college degree. She was accepted into Boston University and graduated in 1983 with a Bachelor of Fine Arts in Theatre.

Career

Early work (1985–1993)

Moore moved to New York City after graduating, and worked as a waitress. After registering her stage name with Actors' Equity, she began her career in 1985 with off-Broadway theatre. Her first screen role came in 1984, in an episode of the soap opera The Edge of Night. Her break came the following year, when she joined the cast of As the World Turns. Playing the dual roles of half-sisters Frannie and Sabrina Hughes, she found this intensive work to be an important learning experience, and she said of it fondly: "I gained confidence and learned to take responsibility." Moore performed on the show until 1988, when she won a Daytime Emmy Award for Outstanding Ingenue in a Drama Series. Before leaving As the World Turns, she had a role in the 1987 CBS miniseries I'll Take Manhattan. Once she finished her contract at World Turns, she played Ophelia in a Guthrie Theater production of Hamlet opposite Željko Ivanek. The actress returned intermittently to television over the next three years, appearing in the TV movies Money, Power, Murder (1989), The Last to Go (1991), and Cast a Deadly Spell (1991).

In 1990, Moore began working with stage director Andre Gregory on a workshop theatre production of Chekhov's Uncle Vanya. Described by Moore as "one of the most fundamentally important acting experiences I ever had", the group spent four years exploring the text and giving intimate performances to friends. Also in 1990, Moore made her cinematic debut as a mummy's victim in Tales from the Darkside: The Movie, a low-budget horror that she later described as "terrible". Her next film role, in 1992, introduced her to a wide audience. The thriller The Hand That Rocks the Cradlein which she played the main character's ill-fated friendwas number one at the US box office, and Moore caught the attention of several critics for her performance. She followed it the same year with the crime comedy The Gun in Betty Lou's Handbag, appearing as the protagonist's kooky sister. She continued to play supporting roles throughout 1993, first featuring in the erotic thriller Body of Evidence as Madonna's love rival. The film was panned by reviewers and heavily mocked, and Moore subsequently regretted her involvement—terming it "a big mistake". She had greater success in a 1993 romantic comedy with Johnny Depp. In Benny & Joon, Moore played a gentle waitress who falls for Aidan Quinn's character, Benny. She also appeared briefly as a doctor in one of the year's biggest hits, the Harrison Ford-starring thriller The Fugitive.

Rise to prominence (1993–1997)
Filmmaker Robert Altman saw Moore in the Uncle Vanya production, and was sufficiently impressed to cast her in his next project: the ensemble drama Short Cuts (1993), based on short stories by Raymond Carver. Moore was pleased to work with him, as his film 3 Women (1977) gave her a strong appreciation for cinema when she saw it in college. Playing artist Marian Wyman was an experience she found difficult, as she was a "total unknown" surrounded by established actors, but this proved to be Moore's breakthrough role. The critic Todd McCarthy called her performance "arresting" and remarked that her monologue, delivered naked from the waist down, would "no doubt be the most discussed scene" of the film. Short Cuts was critically acclaimed, and received awards for Best Ensemble Cast at the Venice Film Festival and the Golden Globe Awards. Moore received an individual nomination for Best Supporting Female at the Independent Spirit Awards, and the monologue scene earned her a degree of notoriety.

Short Cuts was one of a trio of successive film appearances that raised Moore's profile. It was followed in 1994 with Vanya on 42nd Street, a filmed version of her ongoing Uncle Vanya workshop production, directed by Louis Malle. Moore's performance of Yelena was described as "simply outstanding" by Time Out, and she won the Boston Society of Film Critics award for Best Actress. Following this, Moore was given her first leading role, playing an unhappy suburban housewife who develops multiple chemical sensitivity in Todd Haynes' low-budget film Safe (1995). She had to lose a substantial amount of weight for the role, which made her ill, and she subsequently swore off changing her body for a film again. In their review, Empire writes that Safe "first established [Moore's] credentials as perhaps the finest actress of her generation". The film historian David Thomson later described it as "one of the most arresting, original and accomplished films of the 1990s", and the performance earned Moore an Independent Spirit Award nomination for Best Actress. Reflecting on these three roles, Moore remarked, "They all came out at once, and I suddenly had this profile. It was amazing."

Moore's next appearance was a supporting role in the comedy-drama Roommates (1995), playing the daughter-in-law of Peter Falk's character. Her following film, Nine Months (1995), was crucial in establishing her as a Hollywood leading lady. The romantic comedy, directed by Chris Columbus and co-starring Hugh Grant, was poorly reviewed, but a box office success; it remains one of her highest-grossing films. Her next release was also a Hollywood production, as Moore appeared alongside Sylvester Stallone and Antonio Banderas in the thriller Assassins (1995). Despite negativity from critics, the film earned $83.5 million worldwide. Moore's sole appearance of 1996 came in the Merchant Ivory film Surviving Picasso, where she played the artist Dora Maar opposite Anthony Hopkins. The period drama met with poor reviews.

A key point in her career came when Steven Spielberg cast Moore as paleontologist Dr. Sarah Harding in The Lost World: Jurassic Park – the sequel to his 1993 blockbuster Jurassic Park. Filming the big-budget production was a new experience for Moore, and she has said she enjoyed herself "tremendously". It was a physically demanding role, with the actress commenting, "There was so much hanging everywhere. We hung off everything available, plus we climbed, ran, jumped off things ... it was just non-stop." The Lost World (1997) finished as one of the ten highest-grossing films in history to that point, and was pivotal in making Moore a sought-after actress: "Suddenly I had a commercial film career", she said. The Myth of Fingerprints was her second film released in 1997. During its production she met her future husband in director Bart Freundlich. Later that year, Moore made a cameo appearance in the dark comedy Chicago Cab.

Worldwide recognition (1997–2002) 
The late 1990s and early 2000s saw Moore achieve significant industry recognition. Her first Academy Award nomination came for the critically acclaimed Boogie Nights (1997), which centers on a group of individuals working in the 1970s pornography industry. Director Paul Thomas Anderson was not a well-known figure before its production, with only one feature credit to his name, but Moore agreed to the film after being impressed with his "exhilarating" script. The ensemble piece featured Moore as Amber Waves, a leading porn actress and mother-figure who longs to be re-united with her real son. Martyn Glanville of the BBC commented that the role required a mixture of confidence and vulnerability, and was impressed with Moore's effort. Time Out called the performance "superb", while Janet Maslin of The New York Times found it "wonderful". Alongside her Oscar nomination for Best Supporting Actress, Moore was nominated at the Golden Globe and Screen Actors Guild awards, and several critics groups named her a winner.

Moore followed her success in Boogie Nights with a role in the Coen brothers' dark comedy The Big Lebowski (1998). The film was not a hit at the time of its release, but has since become a cult classic. Her role was Maude Lebowski, a feminist artist and daughter of the eponymous character who becomes involved with "The Dude" (Jeff Bridges, the film's star). At the end of 1998, Moore had a flop with Gus Van Sant's Psycho, a remake of the classic Alfred Hitchcock film of the same name. She played Lila Crane in the film, which received poor reviews and is described by The Guardian as one of her "pointless" outings. A review in Boxoffice magazine bemoaned that "a group of enormously talented people wasted several months of their lives" on the film.

After re-uniting with Robert Altman for the dark comedy Cookie's Fortune (1999), Moore starred in An Ideal Husband – Oliver Parker's adaptation of the Oscar Wilde play. Set in London at the end of the nineteenth century, her performance of Mrs. Laura Cheverly earned a Golden Globe nomination for Best Actress in a Musical or Comedy. She was also nominated in the Drama category that year for her work in The End of the Affair (1999). Based on the novel by Graham Greene, Moore played opposite Ralph Fiennes as an adulterous wife in 1940s Britain. The critic Michael Sragow was full of praise for her work, writing that her performance was "the critical element that makes [the film] necessary viewing". Moore received her second Academy Award nomination for the role – her first for Best Actress – as well as nominations at the British Academy Film Awards (BAFTA) and Screen Actors Guild (SAG) awards.

In between her two Golden Globe-nominated performances, Moore was seen in A Map of the World, supporting Sigourney Weaver, as a bereaved mother. Her fifth and final film of 1999 was the acclaimed drama Magnolia, a "giant mosaic" chronicling the lives of multiple characters over one day in Los Angeles. Paul Thomas Anderson, in his follow-up to Boogie Nights, wrote a role specifically for Moore. His primary objective was to "see her explode", and he cast her as a morphine-addicted wife. Moore has said it was a particularly difficult role, but she was rewarded with a SAG nomination. She was subsequently named Best Supporting Actress of 1999 by the National Board of Review, in recognition of her three performances in Magnolia, An Ideal Husband, and A Map of the World.

Apart from a cameo role in the comedy The Ladies Man, Moore's only other appearance in 2000 was in a short-film adaptation of Samuel Beckett's play Not I. In early 2001, she appeared as FBI agent Clarice Starling in Hannibal, a sequel to the Oscar-winning film The Silence of the Lambs. Jodie Foster had declined to reprise the role, and director Ridley Scott eventually cast Moore, over Angelina Jolie, Cate Blanchett, Gillian Anderson, and Helen Hunt. The change in actress received considerable attention from the press, but Moore claimed she was not interested in upstaging Foster. Despite mixed reviews, Hannibal earned $58 million in its opening weekend and finished as the tenth-highest-grossing film of the year. Moore starred in three more 2001 releases: with David Duchovny in the science fiction comedy Evolution, in her husband's dramatic film World Traveler, and with Kevin Spacey, Judi Dench, and Cate Blanchett in The Shipping News. All three films were poorly received.

The year 2002 marked a high point in Moore's career, as she became the ninth performer to be nominated for two Academy Awards in the same year. She received a Best Actress nomination for the melodrama Far from Heaven, in which she played a 1950s housewife whose world is shaken when her husband reveals he is gay. The role was written specifically for her by Todd Haynes, the first time the pair had worked together since Safe, and Moore described it as "a very, very personal project ... such an incredible honor to do". David Rooney of Variety praised her "beautifully gauged performance" of a desperate woman "buckling under social pressures and putting on a brave face". Manohla Dargis of the Los Angeles Times wrote, "what Moore does with her role is so beyond the parameters of what we call great acting that it nearly defies categorization". The role won Moore the Best Actress award from 19 different organizations, including the Venice Film Festival and the National Board of Review.

Moore's second Oscar nomination that year came for The Hours, which she co-starred in with Nicole Kidman and Meryl Streep. She again played a troubled 1950s housewife, prompting Kenneth Turan to write that she was "essentially reprising her Far from Heaven role". Moore said it was an "unfortunate coincidence" that the similar roles came at the same time, and claimed that the characters had differing personalities. Peter Travers of Rolling Stone called the performance "wrenching", while Peter Bradshaw of The Guardian praised a "superbly controlled, humane performance". The Hours was nominated for nine Academy Awards, including Best Picture. Moore also received BAFTA and SAG Award nominations for Best Supporting Actress, and was jointly awarded the Silver Bear for Best Actress with Kidman and Streep at the Berlin International Film Festival.

Established actress (2003–2009) 
Moore did not make any screen appearances in 2003, but returned in 2004, with three films. There was no success in her first two ventures of the year: Marie and Bruce, a dark comedy co-starring Matthew Broderick, did not get a cinematic release; Laws of Attraction followed, where she played opposite Pierce Brosnan in a courtroom-based romantic comedy, but the film was panned by critics. Commercial success returned to Moore with The Forgotten, a psychological thriller in which she played a mother who is told her dead son never existed. Although the film was unpopular with critics, it opened as the US box office number one.

In 2005, Moore worked with her husband for the third time in the comedy Trust the Man, and starred in the true story of 1950s housewife Evelyn Ryan in The Prize Winner of Defiance, Ohio. Her first release of 2006 was Freedomland, a mystery co-starring Samuel L. Jackson. The response was overwhelmingly negative, but her follow-up, Alfonso Cuarón's Children of Men (2006), was highly acclaimed. Moore had a supporting role in the dystopian drama, playing the leader of an activist group. It is listed on Rotten Tomatoes as one of the best reviewed films of her career, and was named by Peter Travers as the second best film of the decade.

Moore made her Broadway debut in the world premiere of David Hare's play The Vertical Hour. The production, directed by Sam Mendes and co-starring Bill Nighy, opened in November 2006. Moore played the role of Nadia, a former war correspondent who finds her views on the 2003 invasion of Iraq challenged. Ben Brantley of The New York Times was unenthusiastic about the production, and described Moore as miscast: in his opinion, she failed to bring the "tough, assertive" quality that her role required. David Rooney of Variety criticized her "lack of stage technique", adding that she appeared "stiffly self-conscious". Moore later admitted she found it difficult performing on Broadway and had not connected with the medium, but was glad to have experimented with it. The play closed in March 2007 after 117 performances.

Moore played an FBI agent for the second time in Next (2007), a science fiction action film co-starring Nicolas Cage and Jessica Biel. Based on a short story by Philip K. Dick, the response from critics was highly negative. Manohla Dargis wrote, "Ms. Moore seems terribly unhappy to be here, and it's no wonder." The actress has since described it as her worst film. Next was followed by Savage Grace (2007), the true story of Barbara Daly Baekeland – a high-society mother whose Oedipal relationship with her son ended in murder. Moore was fascinated by the role. Savage Grace had a limited release, and received predominantly negative reviews. Peter Bradshaw, however, called it a "coldly brilliant and tremendously acted movie".

I'm Not There (2007) saw Moore work with Todd Haynes for the third time. The film explored the life of Bob Dylan, with Moore playing a character based on Joan Baez. In 2008, she starred with Mark Ruffalo in Blindness, a dystopian thriller from the director Fernando Meirelles. The film was not widely seen, and critics were generally unenthusiastic. Moore was not seen on screen again until late 2009, with three new releases. She had a supporting role in The Private Lives of Pippa Lee, and then starred in the erotic thriller Chloe with Liam Neeson and Amanda Seyfried. Shortly afterwards, she appeared in the well-received drama A Single Man. Set in 1960s Los Angeles, the film starred Colin Firth as a homosexual professor who wishes to end his life. Moore played his best friend, "a fellow English expat and semi-alcoholic divorcee", a character that Tom Ford, the film's writer-director, created with her in mind. Leslie Felperin of Variety commented that it was Moore's best role in "some time", and was impressed by the "extraordinary emotional nuance" of her performance. A Single Man was selected as one of the top 10 films of 2009 by the American Film Institute, and Moore received a fifth Golden Globe nomination for her performance in the film.

Return to television and comedic films (2010–2013) 

Moore returned to television for the first time in 18 years when she played a guest role in the fourth season of 30 Rock. She appeared in five episodes of the Emmy-winning comedy, playing Nancy Donovan, a love interest to Alec Baldwin's character Jack Donaghy. She later appeared in the series finale in January 2013. She also returned to As the World Turns as Frannie Hughes, making a brief cameo appearance in a scene with her character's family near the end of the show's run in 2010.

Her first big-screen appearance of the new decade was Shelter (2010), a film described as "heinous" by Tim Robey of The Daily Telegraph. The psychological thriller received negative reviews and did not have a U.S. release until 2013 (retitled 6 Souls). Moore next starred with Annette Bening in the independent film The Kids Are All Right (2010), a comedy-drama about a lesbian couple whose teenage children locate their sperm donor. The role of Jules Allgood was written for her by writer-director Lisa Cholodenko, who felt that Moore was the right age, adept at both drama and comedy, and confident with the film's sexual content. The actress was drawn to the film's "universal" depiction of married life, and committed to the project in 2005. The Kids Are All Right was widely acclaimed, eventually garnering an Oscar nomination for Best Picture. The critic Betsy Sharkey praised Moore's performance of Jules, who she called an "existential bundle of unrealized need and midlife uncertainty", writing, "There are countless moments when the actress strips bare before the camera – sometimes literally, sometimes emotionally ... and Moore plays every note perfectly." The Kids Are All Right earned Moore a sixth Golden Globe Award nomination and a second BAFTA nomination for Best Actress.

For her next project, Moore actively looked for another comedy. She had a supporting role in Crazy, Stupid, Love, playing the estranged wife of Steve Carell, which was favorably reviewed and earned $142.8 million worldwide. Moore was not seen on screens again until March 2012, with a performance that received considerable praise and recognition. She starred in the HBO television film Game Change, a dramatization of Sarah Palin's 2008 campaign to become Vice President. Portraying a well-known figure was something she found challenging; in preparation, she conducted extensive research and worked with a dialect coach for two months. Although the response to the film was mixed, critics were highly appreciative of Moore's performance. For the first time in her career, she received a Golden Globe, a Primetime Emmy, and a SAG Award.

Moore made two film appearances in 2012. The drama Being Flynn, in which she supported Robert De Niro, had a limited release. Greater success came for What Maisie Knew, the story of a young girl caught in the middle of her parents' divorce. Adapted from Henry James's novel and updated to the 21st century, the drama earned near-universal critical praise. The role of Susanna, Maisie's rock-star mother, required Moore to sing on camera, which was a challenge she embraced despite finding it embarrassing. She called Susanna a terrible parent, but said the role did not make her uncomfortable, as she fully compartmentalized the character: "I know that that's not me".

Following her well-received performance in What Maisie Knew, Moore began 2013 with a supporting role in Joseph Gordon-Levitt's comedy Don Jon, playing an older woman who helps the title character to appreciate his relationships. Reviews for the film were favorable, and Mary Pols of Time magazine wrote that Moore was a key factor in its success. Her next appearance was a starring role in the comedy The English Teacher (2013), but this outing was poorly received and earned little at the box office. In October 2013, she played the demented mother Margaret White in Carrie, an adaptation of Stephen King's horror novel. Coming 37 years after Brian De Palma's well-known take on the book, Moore stated that she wanted to make the role her own. By drawing on King's writing rather than the 1976 film, Mick LaSalle of the San Francisco Chronicle wrote that she managed to "[suggest] a history – one never told, just hinted at – of serious damage in [Margaret's] past". Although the film was a box office success, it was generally considered an unsuccessful and unnecessary adaptation.

Critical and commercial success (2014–2017) 

At age 53, Moore enjoyed a considerable degree of critical and commercial success in 2014. Her first release of the year came alongside Liam Neeson in the action-thriller Non-Stop, set aboard an airplane. The response to the film was mixed, but it earned $223 million worldwide. She followed this by winning the Best Actress award at the Cannes Film Festival for her performance as Havana Segrand, an aging actress receiving psychotherapy in David Cronenberg's black comedy Maps to the Stars. Described by The Guardian as a "grotesque, gaudy, and ruthless" character, Moore based her role on "an amalgam of Hollywood casualties she ha[d] encountered", and drew upon her early experiences in the industry. Peter Debruge of Variety was critical of the film, but found Moore to be "incredible" and "fearless" in it. Moore's success at Cannes made her the second actress in history, after Juliette Binoche, to win Best Actress awards at the "Big Three" film festivals (Berlin, Cannes, and Venice). She also received a Golden Globe nomination for her performance.

Moore played the supporting role of President Alma Coin, the leader of a rebellion against The Capitol, in the third installment of the lucrative The Hunger Games film series, Mockingjay – Part 1. The film ranks as her highest-grossing to date. Her final film performance of 2014 ranks among the most acclaimed of her career. In the drama Still Alice, Moore played the leading role of a linguistics professor diagnosed with early onset Alzheimer's disease. She spent four months training for the film, by watching documentaries on the disease and interacting with patients at the Alzheimer's Association. Critic David Thomson wrote that Moore was "extraordinary at revealing the gradual loss of memory and confidence", while according to Kenneth Turan, she was "especially good at the wordless elements of this transformation, allowing us to see through the changing contours of her face what it is like when your mind empties out". Several critics felt it was her finest performance to date, and Moore was awarded with the Golden Globe, SAG, BAFTA, and Academy Award for Best Actress.

Moore began 2015 by appearing as an evil queen in Seventh Son, a poorly received fantasy-adventure film co-starring Jeff Bridges. She also appeared opposite Elliot Page in Freeheld, a drama based on a true story about a detective and her same-sex partner, and in the romantic comedy Maggie's Plan, with Greta Gerwig and Ethan Hawke. Both films were presented at the 2015 Toronto International Film Festival. In Maggie's Plan, Moore played a pretentious Danish professor, a comedic role which critic Richard Lawson of Vanity Fair deemed as the film's "chief pleasure". Later that year, she reprised her role as Alma Coin in The Hunger Games: Mockingjay – Part 2, the final film of the series.

After a one-year absence from the screen, Moore had three film releases in 2017. She appeared in a dual role in Wonderstruck, a film adaptation of Brian Selznick's historical children's novel of the same name, which reteamed her with Todd Haynes. Her parts were of a silent movie star in the 1920s and a deaf librarian in the 1970s; in preparation, she studied sign language and watched the films of Lillian Gish. Richard Lawson considered her to be "eminently watchable" despite her limited screen time. Moore portrayed a dual role for the second time that year in Suburbicon, a satirical thriller written by the Coen brothers and directed by George Clooney. She was cast opposite Matt Damon as twin sisters in 1950s America, named Rose and Margaret, who become embroiled in a local crime. The film received negative reviews, with critics saying it failed to effectively portray American racism, but Geoffrey Macnab of The Independent praised Moore for giving "a perfectly judged comic performance as a Barbara Stanwyck-like femme fatale".

Moore's final release of the year was the sequel to the 2015 spy film Kingsman: The Secret Service, subtitled The Golden Circle, co-starring Colin Firth, Taron Egerton, Channing Tatum, and Halle Berry. She played the part of the villainous entrepreneur Poppy Adams, who runs a drug cartel. Despite her character's actions, Moore played the part to make Poppy seem "strange, but reasonable". Peter Debruge described the film as "outlandish", and wrote that Moore had played her part "as Martha Stewart crossed with a demonic 1950s housewife". The film earned over $410 million worldwide.

Independent films (2018–present) 

Moore had two films that premiered in 2018. She was drawn to Sebastián Lelio's Gloria Bell, an English-language remake of Lelio's own Chilean film Gloria, for its rare depiction of a middle-age woman's quest for meaning in life. Stephen Dalton of The Hollywood Reporter believed she had delivered "an utterly natural and quietly spellbinding star performance". Her second film that year was Bel Canto, a thriller based on Ann Patchett's novel of the same name about the Japanese embassy hostage crisis. For her performance as an opera singer, she learned to mimic the body language of professionals for scenes in which Renée Fleming performed the vocals. Guy Lodge of the Chicago Tribune deemed the film an unsuccessful adaptation of the novel and considered Moore's work to be "edgeless fare by her standards". The following year, she teamed with her husband once again in After the Wedding, a remake of Susanne Bier's Danish film of the same name. It featured her and Michelle Williams in roles played by men in the original film. That same year, she starred in The Staggering Girl, a short film directed by Luca Guadagnino.

In 2020, Moore portrayed the feminist activist Gloria Steinem in the biopic The Glorias, sharing the part with actresses Alicia Vikander and Lulu Wilson. In following year, she had supporting roles opposite Amy Adams in Joe Wright's thriller The Woman in the Window, based on the novel of the same name, and in Stephen Chbosky's musical film Dear Evan Hansen, based on the stage musical of the same name. Both films were poorly received. Moore played the title role in Lisey's Story, an Apple TV+ miniseries adapted from Stephen King's thriller novel of the same name. The miniseries was not well received, despite praise for Moore's work. She took on the leading role of an uptight mother in When You Finish Saving the World (2022), a comedy-drama film by Jesse Eisenberg. The Hollywood Reporters John DeFore commended her for empathetically portraying an unlikable character. Moore served as jury president of the 79th Venice International Film Festival in 2022. 

Moore next starred in the psychological thriller film Sharper (2023), which marked her second project for Apple TV+. She will once again collaborate with Todd Haynes in May December, a romantic drama co-starring Natalie Portman, and will portray Mary Villiers opposite Nicholas Galitzine's George Villiers in the historical drama miniseries Mary & George.

Other ventures

Alongside her acting work, Moore has established a career as a children's author. Her first book, Freckleface Strawberry, was published in October 2007 and became a New York Times Best Seller. Described by Time Out as a "simple, sweet and semi-autobiographical narrative", it tells the story of a girl who wishes to be rid of her freckles, but eventually accepts them. Moore decided to write the book when her young son began disliking aspects of his appearance; she was reminded of her own childhood, when she was teased for having freckles and called "Freckleface Strawberry" by other children.

The book has turned into a series with six follow-ups : Freckleface Strawberry and the Dodgeball Bully was published in 2009, and Freckleface Strawberry: Best Friends Forever in 2011. Both carry the message that children can overcome their own problems. Freckleface Strawberry: Backpacks!, Freckleface Strawberry: Lunch, or What's That? and Freckleface Strawberry: Loose Tooth! were released as part of Random House publisher's "Step Into Reading" program. These were followed by Freckleface Strawberry and the Really Big Voice in summer 2016.

Freckleface Strawberry has been adapted into a musical, written by Rose Caiola and Gary Kupper, which premiered at the New World Stages, New York, in October 2010. Moore had an input in the production, particularly through requesting that it retain the book's young target audience. The show has since been licensed and performed at several venues, which she calls "extremely gratifying and extremely flattering".

Moore has written one children's book separate from the Freckleface Strawberry series. Released in 2013, My Mom is a Foreigner, But Not to Me is based on her experiences of growing up with a mother from another country. The book had a negative reception from Publishers Weekly and Kirkus Reviews; while recognizing it as well-intentioned, Moore's use of verse and rhyme was criticized.

Reception and acting style
Moore has been described by the media as one of the most talented and accomplished actresses of her generation. As a woman in her sixties, she is unusual in being an older actress who continues to work regularly and in prominent roles. She enjoys the variety of starring in both low-budget independent films and large-scale Hollywood productions. In 2004, an IGN journalist wrote of this "rare ability to bounce between commercially viable projects like Nine Months to art house masterpieces like Safe unscathed", adding, "She is respected in art houses and multiplexes alike." She is noted for playing in a range of material, and Ridley Scott, who directed Moore in Hannibal, has praised her versatility. In October 2013, Moore received a star on the Hollywood Walk of Fame. She has been included in People magazine's annual beauty lists on four occasions (1995, 2003, 2008, 2013). In 2015, Time magazine named Moore one of the 100 most influential people in the world on the annual Time 100 list. In 2020, The New York Times ranked her eleventh on its list of the greatest actors of the 21st century, and in a 2022 readers' poll by Empire magazine, she was voted one of the 50 greatest actors of all time.

Moore is particularly known for playing troubled women, and specializes in "ordinary women who suppress powerful emotions". Oliver Burkeman of The Guardian writes that her characters are typically "struggling to maintain a purchase on normality in the face of some secret anguish or creeping awareness of failure". Suzie Mackenzie, also of The Guardian, has identified a theme of "characters in a state of alienation ... women who have forgotten or lost themselves. People whose identity is a question." Her performances often include small hints at emotional turmoil, until there comes a point when the character breaks. The journalist Kira Cochrane has identified this as a "trademark moment" in many of her best films, while it has led Burkeman to call her the "queen of the big-screen breakdown". "When she does finally crack", writes journalist Simon Hattenstone, "it's a sight to behold: nobody sobs from the soul quite like Moore." Ben Brantley of The New York Times has praised Moore's ability to subtly reveal the inner-turmoil of her characters, writing that she is "peerless" in her "portraits of troubled womanhood". When it comes to more authoritative roles, Brantley believes she is "a bit of a bore". "Emotional nakedness is Ms. Moore's specialty", he says, "and it's here that you sense the magic she is capable of."

An interest in portraying "actual human drama" has led Moore to these roles. She is particularly moved by the concept of an individual repressing their troubles and striving to maintain dignity. Parts where the character achieves an amazing feat are of little interest to her, because "we're just not very often in that position in our lives". Early in her career, Moore established a reputation for pushing boundaries, and she continues to be praised for her "fearless" performances and for taking on difficult roles. When asked if there are any roles she has avoided, she replied, "Nothing within the realm of human behavior." She is known for her willingness to perform nude and appear in sex scenes, although she has said she will only do so if she feels it fits the role.

Regarding her approach to acting, Moore said in a 2002 interview that she leaves 95 percent of the performance to be discovered on set: "I want to have a sense of who a character is, and then I want to get there and have it happen to me on camera." The aim, she said, is to "try to get yourself in a position to let the emotion [happen] to you, that you don't bring the emotion to it ... and when it happens, there's nothing better or more exciting or more rewarding."

Personal life
Actor, producer, and stage director John Gould Rubin was Moore's first husband, whom she met in 1984 and married two years later. They separated in 1993, and their divorce was finalized in August 1995. "I got married too early and I really didn't want to be there", she has since explained. Moore began a relationship with Bart Freundlich, her director on The Myth of Fingerprints, in 1996. The couple has a son, Caleb Freundlich (born December 1997) and a daughter, Liv Freundlich (born April 2002). They married in August 2003 and reside in Greenwich Village, New York City. Moore has commented, "We have a very solid family life, and it is the most satisfying thing I have ever done." She tried to keep her family close when working and picked material that was practical for her as a parent.

Moore was featured in the PBS program Finding Your Roots. Researchers mapped out Moore's family tree and analyzed her DNA. When Moore's friend, actor Marisa Tomei did the same, Tomei and Moore learned they are distant cousins.

Political views 
Moore is politically liberal and endorsed Barack Obama in the 2008 and 2012 presidential elections. She is a pro-choice activist and sits on the board of advocates for Planned Parenthood. She is also a campaigner for gay rights and gun control and, since 2008, she has been an Artist Ambassador for Save the Children. 

Moore is a supporter of the Marjory Stoneman Douglas High School students in Parkland, Florida, who organized the March For Our Lives. She also helped release a music video for the group. 

Moore is an atheist; when asked on Inside the Actors Studio what God might say to her upon arrival in heaven, she gave God's response as, "Well, I guess you were wrong, I do exist." She works with Everytown for Gun Safety. Moore opposed Donald Trump immigration policies. In 2020, Moore supported Joe Biden for president.

Acting credits and awards

Moore's most acclaimed films, according to the review-aggregation website Rotten Tomatoes, include:

 Short Cuts (1993)
 Vanya on 42nd Street (1994)
 Safe (1995)
 Boogie Nights (1997)
 The Big Lebowski (1998)
 An Ideal Husband (1999)
 Cookie's Fortune (1999)
 Magnolia (1999)
 The Hours (2002)
 Far from Heaven (2002)
 Children of Men (2006)
 I'm Not There (2007)
 A Single Man (2009)
 The Kids Are All Right (2010)
 Crazy, Stupid, Love (2011)
 What Maisie Knew (2012)
 Carrie (2013)
 Don Jon (2013)
 Still Alice (2014)
 Maggie's Plan (2015)
 Gloria Bell (2018)

Her films that have earned the most at the box office are:

 The Hand That Rocks the Cradle (1992)
 The Fugitive (1993)
 Nine Months (1995)
 The Lost World: Jurassic Park (1997)
 Hannibal (2001)
 The Forgotten (2004)
 Crazy, Stupid, Love (2011)
 Non-Stop (2014)
 The Hunger Games: Mockingjay – Part 1 (2014)
 The Hunger Games: Mockingjay – Part 2 (2015)
 Kingsman: The Golden Circle (2017)

Moore has received five Academy Award nominations, nine Golden Globe nominations, seven SAG nominations, and four BAFTA nominations. From these, she has won an Academy Award, two Golden Globes, a BAFTA, and two SAG Awards; she also has a Primetime Emmy and a Daytime Emmy. In addition, she has been named Best Actress at the Cannes Film Festival, Berlin International Film Festival, and Venice Film Festival – the fourth person, and second woman, in history to achieve this. Her recognized roles came in As the World Turns, Boogie Nights, An Ideal Husband, The End of the Affair, Magnolia, Far From Heaven, The Hours, A Single Man, The Kids Are All Right, Game Change, Maps to the Stars, and Still Alice.

Bibliography

References

External links

 
 
 
 
 
 
 Freckleface Strawberry. Official website for Moore's book series.

 
1960 births
Living people
20th-century American actresses
21st-century American actresses
21st-century American women writers
21st-century American writers
Activists from North Carolina
Actresses from New York City
Actresses from North Carolina
American abortion-rights activists
American atheists
American children's writers
American film actresses
American film producers
American gun control activists
American people of English descent
American people of German-Jewish descent
American people of Scottish descent
American soap opera actresses
American stage actresses
American television actresses
American television producers
American video game actresses
American women children's writers
American women film producers
American women television producers
Audiobook narrators
Best Actress AACTA International Award winners
Best Actress Academy Award winners
Best Actress BAFTA Award winners
Best Drama Actress Golden Globe (film) winners
Best Miniseries or Television Movie Actress Golden Globe winners
Boston University College of Fine Arts alumni
Cannes Film Festival Award for Best Actress winners
Daytime Emmy Award for Outstanding Younger Actress in a Drama Series winners
Film producers from New York (state)
Independent Spirit Award for Best Female Lead winners
American LGBT rights activists
Naturalised citizens of the United Kingdom
New York (state) Democrats
North Carolina Democrats
Outstanding Performance by a Female Actor in a Leading Role Screen Actors Guild Award winners
Outstanding Performance by a Female Actor in a Miniseries or Television Movie Screen Actors Guild Award winners
Outstanding Performance by a Lead Actress in a Miniseries or Movie Primetime Emmy Award winners
People from Fort Bragg, North Carolina
People from Greenwich Village
Silver Bear for Best Actress winners
Television producers from New York (state)
Volpi Cup for Best Actress winners
Volpi Cup winners
Writers from Manhattan
Writers from North Carolina